The Valley is a 2017 American drama film written and directed by Saila Kariat and starring Alyy Khan, Suchitra Pillai, Jake T. Austin, Samina Peerzada, Barry Corbin, Christa B. Allen, Agneeta Thacker and Salma Khan. The plot follows a distraught father as he searches for answers after his college-age daughter's suicide. The film released on March 2, 2018.

Plot
The Valley is the story of an immigrant entrepreneur Neal Kumar and his family, who live in the technologically driven culture that is Silicon Valley. His affluent life appears idyllic from the exterior, however, when his daughter Maya tragically commits suicide, the fractured nature of his interior life becomes apparent to himself and those around him. At the outset, Neal unveils his latest technology Augur from his company Virtually You, which emphasizes how technology enhances human connectedness. Sometime later, he drives to a cliff and pulls out a gun. He remembers the events of the past year, when his daughter has committed suicide. Afterwards, the family is devastated and does not understand the cause of the tragedy. Neal’s quest to find out the truth propels him on an increasingly frantic journey that brings him to the brink of disaster.

Cast

 Alyy Khan as Neal Kumar
 Suchitra Pillai as Roopa Kumar - wife
 Jake T. Austin as Chris Williams
 Samina Peerzada as Didi - housekeeper
 Barry Corbin as Gary - business colleague
 Christa B. Allen as Alicia - friend
 Agneeta Thacker as Maya - daughter
 Salma Khan as Monica - older daughter

Production
In August 2015, Saila Kariat obtained all financing for The Valley and began forming a team. The crew was assembled mostly from the San Francisco Bay Area, while the cast was multi-national. The cast came from Pakistan, India, Los Angeles and New York City.

Filming began in March 2016 in Silicon Valley, California, and was completed in early April. The entire production was completed in 21 days. Post-production was completed in February 2017, and The Valley premiered at Cinequest Film Festival in March 2017.

Release
The film is scheduled to be released on March 2, 2018, in the UK and India and April 6, 2018 for a limited theatrical release.

Critical response
The Valley has been in the festival circuit in 2017, having been in 22 festivals. It has garnered numerous awards including Best Feature Film (3 festivals), Best Original Screenplay, Best Actress, Best Supporting Actress, Best Original Score and Best Cinematography.

References

External links

 Official website
 
 

2017 films
2017 drama films
Films about children
Films set in the San Francisco Bay Area
Films about suicide
Films about depression
American drama films
2010s English-language films
2010s American films
Culture of Silicon Valley
Films shot in California